Chicago 8 may refer to:

 The original name for the Chicago Seven
 The Chicago 8, a 2012 movie about the Chicago Eight (Chicago Seven) group
 Chicago VIII, a 1975 album by American rock band Chicago